Adrianitinae is a subfamily of the Adrianitidae which is part of the goniatitid superfamily Adrianitaceae. The Adrianitinae which comprise the more advanced genera in the Adrianitidae have sutures that form 14 to 30 lobes. Shells may be discoidal or globular or in between.

Taxonomy
The Adriantinae which are found widespread in lower and middle Permian marine sediments are derived from Crimites, a genus in the more primitive Emilitinae subfamily, through Neocrimites which gave rise to Adrianites, Epadrianites, Pseudagathiceras, and Sosiocrimites (Saunders et al. 1999).

In the older taxonomy of Miller et al.,(1960), the Adrianitinae consists of Adrianites, Hoffmannia, Doryceras, Crimites, and Texoceras. Hoffmannia and Texoceras are each now their own subfamily, Hoffmanniinae and Texoceratinae respectively. Doryceras and Crimites are removed from the Adrianitinae and placed in the Emilitinae (sometimes given as Emiliidae).

Epadrianites, Metaricoceras, Neocrimites and Sosiocrimites, which were considered possible equivalents of Adrianites in Miller et al., are distinguished separately in what is now the Adrianitinae. Pseudagathiceras, once thought a possible equivalent of Doryceras, has been added.

Neocrimites is the most primitive of the Adrianitinae and is the source (Saunders et al. 1999) for Adrianites, Epadrianites, Pseudagathiceras, and Sosiocrimites.

Adrianites and related genera are found widespread in the middle  Permian, especially from Sicily and Texas.

Genera
Adrianites
Aricoceras (syn. Metaricoceras)
Crimites (syn. Istycoceras)
Doryceras
Emilites
Epadrianites
Metaricoceras
Neoaricoceras
Neocrimites (Syn. Metacrimites)
Nevadoceras
Palermites
Pamiritella
Pseudagathiceras
Pseudoemilites
Sizilites
Sosiocrimites
Veruzhites

References
 Miller, Furnish, and Schindewolf (1960) ; Paleozoic Ammonoidea, in the Treatise on Invertebrate Paleontology, Part L, Ammonoidea; Geological Society of America and University of Kansas.
 Saunders et al. 1999, Evolution of Complexity in Paleozoic Ammonoid Sutures,  Supplementary Material; Science, 
 

Adrianitidae
Fossil taxa described in 1931